The Giardino dei Semplici, also known as the Orto Botanico dell'Università D'Annunzio is a botanical garden in  Chieti, Abruzzo, central Italy, operated by the D'Annunzio University. It is officially recognized as an area of regional interest.

The garden is located on the southwest corner of the campus in Madonna delle Piane. It currently contains over 400 types of herbs and woody plants related to traditional medicine. It includes both native and exotic plants, although special attention is given to the endemic flora of Abruzzo and to the species that are at risk of extinction.

See also 
 List of botanical gardens in Italy

References 
 Giardino dei Semplici, Università D'Annunzio

Chieti
Chieti
D'Annunzio University of Chieti–Pescara
Gardens in Abruzzo